The 1911 University of New Mexico football team was an American football team that represented the University of New Mexico as an independent during the 1911 college football season. In its first season under head coach Ralph Hutchinson (who was also the university's first athletic director), the team compiled a 1–3–1 record but outscored opponents by a total of 62 to 22. James Guy Hamilton was the team captain.

During the final game of the season against Arizona, the bleachers with 400 persons collapsed, causing several minor injuries.

Schedule

References

University of New Mexico
New Mexico Lobos football seasons
University of New Mexico football